Lauren Benton (born 3 September 1988) is a British activist. She is the founder and chief executive officer of the charity BODY Charity. Benton is known for her weight loss as a result of Body Dysmorphic Disorder (BDD), an issue for which she founded the charity.

Founded in March 2011, BODY Charity is the UK's first charity to raise awareness of Body Dysmorphic Disorder.

Since being diagnosed herself with the disorder, Benton has raised the issue with public speaking and lectures.

Benton won an enterprising woman award in 2013.

References

External links
 BODY Charity

1988 births
British activists
Living people
Place of birth missing (living people)